The 2001 Copa del Rey Final took place on 30 June 2001 at the Estadio de La Cartuja, Sevilla. The match was contested by Celta de Vigo and Real Zaragoza, and it was refereed by José María García-Aranda. Real Zaragoza lifted the trophy for the fifth time in their history with a 3-1 victory over Celta de Vigo.

Match details

External links
RSSSF

References

2001
Copa Del Rey Final, 2001
RC Celta de Vigo matches
Real Zaragoza matches
21st century in Seville
Sports competitions in Seville